Gigaxonin also known as kelch-like protein 16 is a protein that in humans is encoded by the GAN gene.

Function 

Gigaxonin is a member of the cytoskeletal BTB / kelch (Broad-Complex, Tramtrack and Bric a brac) repeat family. (Kelch repeats are predicted to form a beta-propeller shape.) Gigaxonin plays a role in neurofilament architecture and is mutated in giant axonal neuropathy.

See also 
 Giant axonal neuropathy with curly hair

References

Further reading